Branfield is a surname. Notable people with the surname include:

Jack Branfield (1891–?), English footballer
Pip Branfield (born 1952), English bowls player

See also
Brasfield